Avis Fletcher (formerly McIntosh, née Brain; born 19 May 1938) is a former New Zealand hurdler and sprinter.

Life
She joined Lynndale Amateur Athletic and Harrier Club in the children's division in the 12- to 13-year-old age group. She also ran for Glen Eden, Waitemata and Owairaka Athletic Club. At Avondale College in 1953, she won the 100 yards senior girls when she was 14.
From 1954 to 1956 McIntosh won the Auckland Championship two and-a-half mile cross country and the Hamilton road race. 
After winning her first New Zealand title in 1958, and not being selected for Cardiff's Empire Games, McIntosh was chosen to represent New Zealand from 1959 to 1965. 
In 1962, McIntosh was selected for the 7th British Empire and Commonwealth Games at Perth. She competed in the 80m hurdles and relay.
McIntosh was first in the 80m hurdles heat, beating the world record holder in 10.8 sec, the new Commonwealth Games record. At the 1962 British Empire and Commonwealth Games she won the bronze medal in the women's 80 m hurdles. She also won a bronze medal as part of the women's 4 x 110 yards relay team. Her teammates in the relay were Nola Bond, Molly Cowan and Doreen Porter. An interesting tale is that Murray Halberg lost her medal in the toilets and had to be told to go back and find it.
 
On 18 March 1964 at the Lovelock track in Auckland, McIntosh won the 80m hurdles in 10.7 sec. It was the fastest time ever by a New Zealand women's athlete.

At the 1964 Tokyo Olympics, McIntosh was third in the 80m hurdles heat in 10.8 sec. She was fifth in the semi-final in 10.9 sec and 10th fastest overall. In the 100 yards, McIntosh was fourth in her heat and sixth in the quarter final. This event no longer exists.

A very fine all-round athlete, her skills ranged from hurdling, running, jumping, cross-country and pentathlon. She won 24 Auckland titles including 10 straight in the 80m hurdles from 1956 to 1965. She also won the long jump five times, pentathlon three times and high jump, 75 yards and 100 yards once each.

When she was 40, McIntosh competed in the World Veteran Games and won the 80m hurdles and was second in the 100 yards. McIntosh has records for long jump, high jump, 100 metres, hammer, and discus all achieved at 50 years of age. She then went on to get the records for discus, high jump, hammer, javelin & long jump at 60 years old!

McIntosh competed at one Olympic Games in Tokyo in 1964 in the 100 metres and 80 metre hurdles.

In 2009 she, then named Avis Fletcher was honoured again in a ceremony to recognise New Zealand's Olympians. She was married to Matty with three children and she had run two farms.

References

1938 births
Olympic athletes of New Zealand
New Zealand female sprinters
Commonwealth Games bronze medallists for New Zealand
Commonwealth Games medallists in athletics
Athletes (track and field) at the 1962 British Empire and Commonwealth Games
Athletes (track and field) at the 1964 Summer Olympics
New Zealand female hurdlers
Living people
Medallists at the 1962 British Empire and Commonwealth Games